Laqaya (Aymara for ruins of a building, also spelled Lakaya) is a  mountain in the Chilla-Kimsa Chata mountain range in the Andes of Bolivia. It is situated in the La Paz Department, Ingavi Province, at the border of the Jesús de Machaca Municipality and the Tiwanaku Municipality.

References 

Mountains of La Paz Department (Bolivia)